The Seduction is the first full-length album by English post-punk band Ludus, released in 1981 by record label New Hormones.

Content 

The album, considered by many to be the band's masterpiece, contains some of their most accessible and melodic songs (such as "Mirror Mirror", "The Escape Artist" and "See the Keyhole"), as well as some of their most adventurous work (such as the 10 minutes long improvisational instrumental "The Dynasty"). In keeping with the band's penchant for experimentation and unusual song structures, the album's key track, Herstory, practically consists of variations on 4 different songs (including the track 5 of this album, "Inheritance", and two previously released songs, "Mutilate" and "Mother's Hour"), sliding effortlessly one into another. The album also contains an extended, 6 minutes long version of the previous single, "My Cherry Is in Sherry".

Release 

The Seduction was originally released as a double EP on 12" vinyl by New Hormones in 1982. The album has been released along with the band's debut EP The Visit as the compilation The Visit/The Seduction, on the label Les Temps Modernes.

Reception 

AllMusic called the album "the band's career high point".

In a feature for The Quietus, Brian DeGraw of Gang Gang Dance listed the album among his favourites.

Track listing

 "Unveiled (A Woman's Travelogue)"
 "My Cherry Is in Sherry"
 "See the Keyhole"
 "Herstory"
 "Inheritance"
 "Dynasty"
 "Mirror Mirror"
 "The Escape Artist"

References

External links 
 

Ludus albums
1981 debut albums